Prison Radio is a San Francisco-based radio and activist project that produces the commentaries of several prisoners considered to be political prisoners, most notably Mumia Abu-Jamal. Multiple radio stations across the United States broadcast these commentaries. The project's political aims include analyzing the prison-industrial complex and attempting to present a more humanistic view of prisoners to the public.

Alongside the Prisoners of Conscience Committee, the Prison Radio Project sponsored a birthday celebration rally for Mumia Abu-Jamal.

References

External links
 
Prison Radio website (archived version)

Non-profit organizations based in San Francisco
Prison-related organizations
Political imprisonment in the United States